The Wandelweiser Group is an international group of composers/performers. It was founded in 1992 by Dutch-born flautist Antoine Beuger and German violinist Burkhard Schlothauer. In 1993 Swiss clarinetist Jürg Frey was invited to join, followed by American guitarist Michael Pisaro, Swiss pianist Manfred Werder, then Austrian trombonist Radu Malfatti the following year, then American trombonist Craig Shepard, and others. The group runs its own publishing operation, Edition Wandelweiser, and its own record label Wandelweiser Records.

The music of the Wandelweiser collective is characterized by sparse, quiet, fragile soundscapes incorporating frequent silences. According to Radu Malfatti, Wandelweiser music is about "the evaluation and integration of silence(s) rather than an ongoing carpet of never-ending sounds." Michael Pisaro suggests that Wandelweiser works, which often involve extended durations of hours or longer, offer an alternative relationship to time; these pieces "become not a duration to mark, but a space to occupy".

John Cage is a figure of central importance to the Wandelweiser composers; their music is often referred to as "silent music," taking as its starting point Cage's work 4'33", the first composition to consist largely of silence, after the "Marche Funebre" by the Frenchman Alphonse Allais. According to Pisaro, "Beginning with the music of John Cage, it has become possible to see time as having its own structure: not as something imposed on it from the outside by music, but something which is already present, which exists alongside the music."

Performers
Makiko Nisikaze
Mark So
Quatuor Bozzini
Cristián Alvear

Composers
Antoine Beuger
Dante Boon
Daniel Brandes
Johnny Chang
Jürg Frey
Ben Glas
Mark Hannesson
Eva-Maria Houben
Carlo Inderhees
Marcus Kaiser
Jukka-Pekka Kervinen
Bin Li
Radu Malfatti
André O. Möller
Anastassis Philippakopoulos
Michael Pisaro
Kory Reeder
Burkhard Schlothauer
Sam Sfirri
Craig Shepard
Thomas Stiegler
Taylan Susam
Stefan Thut
Emmanuelle Waeckerlé
Manfred Werder

References

External links
Edition Wandelweiser homepage
The Sound of Silence article from Paris Transatlantic
CD review by La Folia
Article from Neue Musikzeitung 
"Wandelweiser und so weiter" 6CD Box Set dedicated to Wandelweiser composers
History of Wandelweiser by Michael Pisaro
Wandelweiser archives at le son du grisli
Alex Ross on Wandelweiser 

International music organizations
Composition schools
Arts organizations established in 1992